Serbia and Montenegro Handball Cup was the national handball cup competition in Serbia and Montenegro.

Winners

Results by teams

See also
 Yugoslav Handball Cup
 Serbian Handball Cup

References

External links
 Handball Federation of Serbia
 Handball Federation of Montenegro

Handball competitions in Serbia
Handball competitions in Montenegro